Paul Brewster may refer to:
 Paul Brewster (Gaelic footballer) (born 1971), Northern Irish Gaelic footballer
 Paul Brewster (American football) (1935–2021), American football coach